Several ships of the United States Navy have been named USS Hancock or USS John Hancock, in honor of patriot, Founding Father, and statesman John Hancock.

 was the former schooner Speedwell, one of a small flotilla hired in October 1775. She was declared unfit for service late in 1776, and returned to her owner early the following year.
 was a sailing frigate commissioned in 1776 and captured by the British in 1777. Renamed HMS Iris, in 1781 she was captured by a French squadron. The French Navy sold her in 1784.
USS Hancock (1778), was a frigate launched 28 April 1778, and renamed  by the Continental Congress to honor the entry of France into the war.
, originally SS Arizona, was purchased by the United States Department of War, then transferred to the Navy in 1902, and used as a transport until 1925.
, was an aircraft carrier originally named Ticonderoga, and renamed while under construction in 1943. Hancock was launched in 1944 and sold for scrap in 1976.

See also

United States Navy ship names